Paramylostoma arcualis is an extinct selenosteid arthrodire placoderm from the Late Famennian Cleveland Shale of Late Devonian Ohio.  It has a compressed, box-like head and thoracic armor, and large, rounded orbits.  However, in comparison with other selenosteids, such as Selenosteus, P. arcualis''' orbits were rather small.  P. arcualis'' had smooth jaws that suggest the animal was durophagous.

References

Selenosteidae
Placoderms of North America
Fossil taxa described in 1945
Paleontology in Ohio
Famennian life
Famennian genus first appearances
Famennian genus extinctions